2-Bromo-4,5-methylenedioxyamphetamine (6-Bromo-MDA) is a lesser-known psychedelic drug and a substituted amphetamine. It was first synthesized by Alexander Shulgin. In his book PiHKAL, the dose is listed as 350 mg and the duration unknown. It produces stimulant effects but with no psychedelic or empathogenic action. Very little data exists about its pharmacological properties, metabolism, and toxicity.

See also 
 2-Bromomescaline
 6-Chloro-MDMA
 Phenethylamine
 Psychedelics, dissociatives and deliriants

References

Bromoarenes
Substituted amphetamines
Benzodioxoles